The Vorder Glärnisch (2,327 m) is a mountain of the Schwyzer Alps, overlooking the valley of the Linth in the canton of Glarus. It lies north-east of the higher Glärnisch (2,914 m).

Unlike its higher neighbour, the Vorder Glärnisch can be ascended via a trail on its north-west side.

References

External links
Vorder Glärnisch on Hikr

Mountains of the Alps
Mountains of Switzerland
Mountains of the canton of Glarus
Two-thousanders of Switzerland